The Clay Center Carnegie Library in Clay Center, Kansas is a Carnegie library built in 1912.  It was listed on the National Register of Historic Places in 1987.

References

Carnegie libraries in Kansas
National Register of Historic Places in Clay County, Kansas
Neoclassical architecture in Kansas
Library buildings completed in 1912